The 1913 Australia rugby union tour of New Zealand was a collection of friendly rugby union games undertaken by the Australia national rugby union team against various invitational teams from New Zealand and also against the New Zealand national team.

The team played in the light-blue jersey of NSW Waratahs with the state emblem and the word "Australia" on the chest. Australia played 8 matches, with only 3 victories and 5 defeats.

Touring party

Management
Manager: M.C. Morgan
Captain: Larry Dwyer
Vice-captain: Ted Fahey

Full backs
 R. Simpson (New South Wales)

Three quarters
 D. Suttor (New South Wales)
 Larry Dwyer (New South Wales)
 E. Carr (New South Wales)
 L. Wogan (New South Wales)
 L. Meibush (Queensland)
 M.J. McMahon (Queensland)
 Fred Wood (New South Wales)
 J. Flynn (Queensland)
 H.A. Jones (New South Wales)

Half backs
 William Tasker (New South Wales)

Forwards
 Harold George (New South Wales)
 C. O'Donnell (New South Wales)
 Bill Watson (New South Wales)
 Ted Fahey (New South Wales)
 Clarrie Wallach (New South Wales)
 D.B. Hughes (New South Wales)
 F. Thompson (New South Wales)
 R. Roberts (New South Wales)
 R.B. Hill (New South Wales)
 D. Williams (Queensland) 
 A. Horadan (Queensland) 
 P. Murphy (Queensland) 
 W. Cody (New South Wales)
 IL Jones (New South Wales)

Match summary 
Complete list of matches played by the Wallabies in New Zealand:

 Test matches

Match details

Auckland RU

New Zealand (1st Test)

New Zealand (2nd Test)

New Zealand (3rd Test)

Bibliography 
Found on Papers Past website

 Auckland Star, Monday 25 August 1913, p. 6
 Evening Post, Thursday 28 August 1913, p. 4
 Auckland Star, Monday 1 September 1913, p. 8
 Evening Post, Thursday 4 September 1913, p. 4
 Colonist, Monday 8 September 2013, p. 6
 Wairarapa Daily Times, Thursday 11 September 1913, p. 6
 Auckland Star, Monday 15 September 1913, p. 8
 Evening Post, Thursday 18 September 1913, p. 4
 Evening Post, Monday 22 September 1913, p. 4
 Evening Post, Thursday 25 September 1913, p. 4

References

Australia national rugby union team tours of New Zealand
1913 in New Zealand rugby union
tour